Megan Degenfelder (born 1988/1989) is an American politician who is the Wyoming Superintendent of Public Instruction following the 2022 election. She was previously the Chief Policy Officer of superintendent Jillian Balow, who held the position from 2014 to January 2022. She is a member of the Republican Party.

Electoral history

References

External links

1980s births
21st-century American women politicians
21st-century American politicians
Living people
Superintendents of Public Instruction of Wyoming
Women in Wyoming politics
Wyoming Republicans